Petergof, known as Petrodvorets from 1944 to 1997, is a municipal town in Petrodvortsovy District of the federal city of St. Petersburg, located on the southern shore of the Gulf of Finland.

The town hosts one of two campuses of Saint Petersburg State University and the Petrodvorets Watch Factory, one of the leading Russian watch manufactures. A series of palaces and gardens, laid out on the orders of Peter the Great and sometimes called the "Russian Versailles," is also situated there. The palace-ensemble along with the city center is recognized as a UNESCO World Heritage Site.

Palaces, fountains, and gardens

Petergof is named after the Peterhof Grand Palace, a sixteen-meter-high bluff lying less than a hundred meters from the shore. The majority of Peterhof's fountains are contained here, as are several small palaces and outbuildings. East of the Lower Gardens lies the Alexandria Park with 19th-century Gothic Revival structures such as the Gothic Chapel.

Atop the bluff, near the middle of the Lower Gardens, stands the Grand Palace (Bolshoy Dvorets). To the south of it are the comparatively small Upper Gardens (Verkhny Sad). Upon the bluff's face below the Palace is the Grand Cascade (Bolshoy Kaskad). This and the Grand Palace are the centerpiece of the entire complex. At its foot begins the Sea Channel (Morskoy Kanal), one of the most extensive waterworks of the Baroque period, which bisects the Lower Gardens.

St. Petersburg State University
Besides the downtown campus, certain Saint Petersburg State University's schools and departments are located in Petergof:
Graduate School of Management's campus in Mikhailovka (under reconstruction)
Faculty of Biology and Soil Studies' research center in Sergievka (Leuchtenberg Palace)
Petrodvorets Complex including four faculties:
Applied Mathematics and Control Processes
Chemistry
Mathematics and Mechanics
Physics
seven research institutes:
Astronomy
Chemistry
Computational Mathematics and Control Processes
Laser Research
Mathematics and Mechanics
Radiophysics
Physics
as well as 12 dormitories and a number of infrastructure objects.

The Petrodvorets Complex dates back to 1960s when it was decided to copy best international practices and to construct a brand-new suburban campus for the University, which had a crucial need for new premises. However, the idea was said to be widely opposed by the faculty, who did not want to commute two hours a day, and as few as four faculties relocated to Petergof.

In the 1990s the number of students from other regions fell significantly, and the University sold many of its downtown dormitories. When the trend reversed, the need for housing made the University administration accommodate most students in Petergof, even those studying in downtown faculties, which has created certain tensions. Still, the idea of a suburban campus seems to be persistent, as the Government of the Russian Federation has decided to hand over the Mikhailovka estate to the University to reconstruct it and house the Graduate School of Management's campus.

Due to the extensive presence of research facilities, mainly belonging to St. Petersburg State University, Petergof was named a naukograd in 2005.

Petrodvorets Watch Factory
Russia's oldest factory was founded by Peter the Great in 1721 first as a lapidary plant to help in the construction of the Peterhof Palaces but also other Palaces in St. Petersburg. It started to produce equipment and parts for the watch industry in the 1920s. After World War II, the factory started to produce complete watches under the brand name Pobeda and from 1961 under the brand Raketa. in 1985 the factory had 7500 employees and was producing 5 million mechanical watches per year. Today, it is the last watch factory in Russia producing its own movements from A to Z, though the production is much smaller than it used to be.

Telegraph Station

Transportation

The town is served by three railway stations (Novy Petergof, Stary Petergof, and Universitet).  The palaces of Peterhof are accessible by sea via hydrofoils based near the Winter Palace in St. Petersburg. The palace is also easily accessed by road. Public transit and private van services make regular trips from Saint Petersburg.

The Upper Gardens are freely accessible, but entry to the Lower Gardens requires the purchase of tickets (not included in the boat fee for visitors arriving by hydrofoil). The palaces and grotto are accessible only as part of guided tours.

Sister cities
 Bad Homburg vor der Höhe, Germany
 Le Blanc-Mesnil, France

Former sister cities:
 Sopot, Poland

On 10 March 2022, the Polish town of Sopot terminated its partnership with Peterhof as a response to the 2022 Russian invasion of Ukraine.

References

Vernova, N (2004). Peterhof: The Fountains. St. Petersburg: Abris.
Vernova, N (2004). Peterhof: The Grand Palace. St. Petersburg: Abris.

External links

Peterhof's official site
Institute of Physics
Official site of the Peterhof Watch Factory
Official website of the museum
Peterhof (Petrodvorets) – a Gardens Guide review
Peterhof: history of gardens and town 
Russian TV program about the 300 years of the Petrodvorets Factory (In Rus with Eng subtitles)

Further reading

 
Cities and towns under jurisdiction of Saint Petersburg
Petergofsky Uyezd
Naukograds
Baroque architecture in Russia
Fountains in Russia